Alice Fisher (13 June 1839 – 2 June 1888) was a nursing pioneer. During her brief career at the Philadelphia General Hospital (PGH) she improved the standards of care at the institution and created the hospital's nursing school.

Early life
Born in England, Fisher trained at the Nightingale Training School and Home for Nurses (now part of King's College London) and served as a superintendent in several hospitals in the UK before coming to the United States in 1884.

Fisher's father was both an astronomer (at the Royal Observatory, Greenwich) and a priest. While still at home, she wrote two novels, Too Bright to Last, 1873, and a three-volume His Queen, published, which was published in 1875. It was only after her father's death in 1873 that she took up nurse training, at the Nightingale School at St Thomas’ Hospital, beginning in 1874.

Career
She was appointed Superintendent at PGH and charged with transforming nursing and medical care at the deteriorated institution. She instituted dramatic improvement in standards of care in the institution and created the hospital's nursing school. Both achievements demonstrated the value of trained nurses in the early years of the profession's development.
 
After completing her training, she nursed briefly at two hospitals, the Edinburgh Royal Infirmary and the Fever Hospital, Newcastle upon Tyne. She then became superintendent, also briefly, at three other British hospitals, where she made significant improvements in the standard of nursing: Addenbrooke's, at Cambridge; the Birmingham General Hospital, where she instituted a nursing school; and the Radcliffe Infirmary, Oxford, where she instituted lectures for the nursing staff. With a fellow Nightingale nurse, Rachel Williams, she produced an early book on nursing, Hints to Hospital Nurses.

Fisher made occasional visits to her mentor, Florence Nightingale. The two corresponded, but Nightingale's letters to her are not extant. Letters Fisher wrote her on conditions in her  posts are at the British Library.

In 1884 Fisher was appointed superintendent at the Pennsylvania General Hospital, also known as the Blockley Hospital, where she again brought in radical improvements and created the hospital's nursing school. Her nursing career was brief—a mere 13 years after training—but remarkably productive. She died of heart disease in 1888.

Death
Fisher tenure was short: she succumbed to heart disease in 1888. Her burial site at The Woodlands Cemetery lies adjacent to the former hospital grounds and, for decades, was the site of a procession of nursing students from PGH and other hospitals in the region.

References

Bibliography
http://www.aahn.org/gravesites/fisher.html
Cope, Zachary. Six Disciples of Florence Nightingale. London: Pitman Medical 1961 57–74.
O’Donnell, Donna Gentile. Provider of Last Resort: The Story of the Closure of the Philadelphia General Hospital. Camino Books, Philadelphia, 1995.
Lynaugh, Joan E., “Alice Fisher (1839-1888),” Oxford Dictionary of National Biography.
McDonald, Lynn. “Alice Fisher,” in Lynn McDonald, ed., Florence Nightingale on Extending Nursing. Waterloo ON: Wilfrid Laurier University Press 2009:908-09.
Smith, Marion E. “The Pioneer Work of Alice Fisher in Philadelphia,” American Journal of Nursing 4,10 (July 1904):803-09. Agnes Jones.

External links

1839 births
1888 deaths
American nurses
American women nurses
Nurses from London
English emigrants to the United States
Victorian women writers
Victorian writers
English women novelists
Burials at The Woodlands Cemetery